Night Fishing (Original Korean title: 파란만장; Paranmanjang, lit. "Ups and Downs." or "A Checkered Past") is a 2011 South Korean fantasy-horror short film directed, produced, written by PARKing CHANce (brand name of the brothers, Park Chan-wook and Park Chan-kyong). The lead role is played by K-pop star, Lee Jung-hyun.

It was shot entirely on the Apple iPhone 4, and was financially supported by KT (South Korea's exclusive distributor of the iPhone at the time), which supplied the duo with 150 million Korean Won (US$133,447). It was screened to over 100 reporters on January 11, 2011, and opened for public release on January 27.

The film won the Golden Bear for Best Short Film at the 61st Berlin International Film Festival.

Plot 
A man casually sets up for a fishing trip at the water's edge. Evening comes and a tug on his line presents him with the body of a woman. While he tries to disentangle himself from the fishing lines, she comes alive. The scene changes and the woman is now a shaman priestess in a funeral ritual for a man who drowned in a river. He speaks through her to his relatives, asking for forgiveness.

Cast 
 Lee Jung-hyun as a female shaman
 Oh Kwang-rok as Oh Kee-seok, a fisherman
 Lee Yong-nyeo as mother of Kee-seok

Production 
The film was captured entirely using iPhone 4, with the additional extra lenses and otherwise regular filmmaking equipment.

References

External links 
 
 
 Night Fishing at Cine 21 

2011 films
2011 fantasy films
2011 horror films
South Korean fantasy films
South Korean horror films
South Korean short films
Paranormal films
Films about spirituality
Films about the afterlife
Films directed by Park Chan-wook
2010s Korean-language films
Mobile phone films
2010s South Korean films